Posavski Venac (Serbian Cyrillic: Посавски венац) is a proposed municipality of the City of Belgrade, the capital of Serbia.

Movement 

One of the latest movements for the creation of new municipalities within the territory of the City of Belgrade. Originating in 2006, the movement centered on separating entire non-urban and part of urban section of the municipality of Čukarica into new municipality of Posavski Venac. Non-urban section consists of the suburban settlements of Rušanj, Sremčica, Umka, Velika Moštanica, Pećani, Rucka and Ostružnica, while from the urban section splitting neighborhoods would be Makiš and Železnik whose inhabitants appear to be the most vocal supporters of the movement. The area largely corresponds to the areas of the former municipalities of Železnik and Umka. If created, the municipality would have a population of 62,311 according to the 2002 census of population.

See also 

 List of former and proposed municipalities of Belgrade

References

External links 

 Večernje Novosti

Former and proposed municipalities of Belgrade
Čukarica